This is a list of episodes of the South Korean variety show Running Man in 2016. The show airs on SBS as part of their Good Sunday lineup.

Episodes

Ratings
 Ratings listed below are the individual corner ratings of Running Man. (Note: Individual corner ratings do not include commercial time, which regular ratings include.)

Notes

References

External links 
  Running Man on the Official Good Sunday page
  Running Man Official Homepage on SBS The Soty

Lists of Running Man (TV series) episodes
Lists of variety television series episodes
Lists of South Korean television series episodes
2016 in South Korean television